Terrorvision are an English rock band. They were formed in 1987 (as The Spoilt Bratz) in Keighley, West Yorkshire, England, and initially disbanded in 2001. The band used Bradford as a base after the name change to Terrorvision in 1991, by which time the band members had all moved there.

History
The re-release of their second single, "My House" (from the album Formaldehyde), in January 1994 proved to be Terrorvision's breakthrough to UK Singles Chart success, and preceded by months the release of their second album How to Make Friends and Influence People in April 1994. The leading single from that album, "Oblivion", was also a chart success. All subsequent singles achieved Top 40 entries in the UK, culminating in the release of "Tequila", which reached number 2. The band won the Kerrang! Award for Best Newcomer in 1994, (the award at the time was not split into British and International categories), then followed this up with Best British Band the following year.

A video compilation, Fired Up and Lairy, was released in April 1995 and included spoof documentary segments interspersed with all the band's videos to date. A third album, Regular Urban Survivors, followed in March 1996 and spawned four singles: "Perseverance" (their first Top 5 single, peaking at number 5), "Celebrity Hit List," "Bad Actress" and "Easy". Lead singer Tony Wright presented the BBC TV music show Top of the Pops on one occasion, and made several appearances on the comedy music quiz Never Mind the Buzzcocks.

The band's fourth album, Shaving Peaches, appeared in October 1998. The album's first single, "Josephine," had been well-received the previous month, but it was a Mint Royale remix of "Tequila" which was to prove to be their biggest-ever hit, reaching number 2 in the UK chart in January 1999. That year, the song was awarded Best Single at the Kerrang! Awards.

The choice was a controversial one among fans. The band originally put a selection of their potential single releases to members of their official fan club, who voted in favour of "Day After Day." However, the remixed version of "Tequila" gained favour with BBC Radio 1 DJ Zoë Ball, who championed its release as a single. Plans to release "Day After Day" were hastily shelved, and a video was quickly shot for the "Tequila" release. A few promo copies of the "Day After Day" single still exist.

Thus, despite having their greatest hit in 1999 with the track, they were dropped by their record label, EMI, after the release of the album's third single, "III Wishes." It was the band's first single to fall outside the UK Top 40 since the release of "My House," six years earlier. During this time the band recruited a fifth member, Josephine Ellul, who played keyboards and sang backing vocals at concerts.

The band signed to a smaller label, Papillon, and put out a fifth studio album, Good to Go, in 2001. The record, like all their others, was also credited to Total Vegas, the band's own independent imprint. A number of singles followed, but the band was unable to replicate their previous success. Their final single, "Fists of Fury," gained some notoriety for its video, which aped the cowboy-themed clip accompanying Madonna's single, "Don't Tell Me."

EMI issued Whales and Dolphins, a greatest-hits collection in 2001, and the band decided to call it a day, after a farewell tour. The 'final' concert took place at Penningtons nightclub in their hometown of Bradford, on 4 October 2001, and was released with an interview DVD as a live album, Take the Money & Run - The Final Concert.

Reunion
The group reformed to play two tours in 2005, and played what was described as their 'last ever show' at Rock In The Castle in Scarborough, Yorkshire, on 17 September 2005, as Special Guests of The Wildhearts. A collection of b-sides and rarities was also issued by EMI in September 2005.

Terrorvision then played three dates in November 2007 in Manchester, Holmfirth and Sheffield. Danny Lambert, the singer in Yates' band Blunderbuss, which was by then inactive, stood in on bass for an unavailable Marklew for these three shows. This was followed by a homecoming show at the Victoria Hall in Saltaire in December 2007 and a new tour in 2008 entitled the '4 Days in May Tour' in Nottingham, Bristol, London Shepherd's Bush and Norwich UEA, this time with a returned Marklew. They also played three dates over Easter 2009 to commemorate the 15th anniversary of the release of How to Make Friends and Influence People, at the Manchester Academy, Wolverhampton's Wulfrun Hall, and the Shepherd's Bush Empire, London. The gigs at Manchester Academy and Shepherd's Bush Empire offered limited edition live recordings of the shows through Concert Live. A similar tour took place in December 2009. On 4 December 2009, Terrorvision played at Hard Rock Hell 3. They returned again in 2010, and began working on a new record. Shutty, their original drummer, left at this stage after 20 years playing with the band and was replaced by Cameron Greenwood.
Terrorvision headlined on the Bohemia Stage at the 2010 Sonisphere festival at Knebworth House. Terrorvision also performed in Holmfirth, Bristol, Cardiff and Bolton in July 2010.

On 13 January 2011, singer Tony Wright announced on Facebook that they would be releasing a new album in 2011, and would be going on a UK tour to support it. The tour was to start in Newcastle on 24 February. The new album, Super Delux, was duly released on 24 February 2011 to generally positive reviews.

Terrorvision returned again in 2016 for a five date arena tour of the UK supporting UK rockers Thunder. Bassist Leigh Marklew said, "We were discussing the idea of getting back in the ring in 2016 – when the call came from Thunder the timing was perfect. We agreed it would be a great way to come back."

In November 2017, a triple-headline tour, called "Britrock Must Be Destroyed", was announced with Reef and The Wildhearts. The tour was eight dates across the UK in May 2018, and featured full sets from each band, with a different running order each night. In February 2018, UK Britpop band Dodgy were announced as the opening act for all eight dates. In March 2018, the tour was extended to five dates, across August and September, in Australia.

A 25th anniversary tour celebrating How to Make Friends and Influence People was announced by the band in a video-post on Facebook in November 2018, with dates at London's Islington Assembly Hall, SWX Bristol, Rock City Nottingham, and the O2 Ritz in Manchester in May 2019, with support from The Amorettes.
In December 2019, the group released their first new single for seven years, "Our Christmas Song".

Side projects
After splitting up, singer Tony Wright formed Laika Dog as well as working as a dry stone waller. He has also released two solo albums and an album recorded with Ryan Hamilton. 

Guitarist Mark Yates joined firstly the short-lived Boston Crabs and then formed Blunderbuss, releasing one album to date, "Relentless," and then formed another new band, Badwolf; whilst Leigh Marklew formed Malibu Stacey, who released one album, "On Heat," before splitting up. Josephine Ellul now manages bands and sings. Mark Yates now plays guitar in rock band Boomville alongside Ben Moran, former bass player with Leeds Band Little Black Hearts.

Covers
Terrorvision have covered many songs, often as B-sides to their singles. Covers included "Wishing Well" by Free and "Surrender" by Cheap Trick. One of the tracks on the 1992 Problem Solved EP is a cover of Motorhead's "We Are The Roadcrew". Other covers include "Bring Your Daughter... to the Slaughter" by Iron Maiden with a jazz flavour, performed in a Radio One live session, and more recently covered "Oh My God" live during their 'Lost Weekend' 2007 tour, with stand-in bassist Danny Lambert performing lead vocals. They have also covered 5ive's "Keep on Movin'" and David Bowie's "Moonage Daydream".

Band members
Current members
Tony Wright – lead vocals (1987–2001, 2005–present)
Mark Yates – guitars (1987–2001, 2005–present)
Leigh Marklew – bass (1987–2001, 2005–present)
Cameron Greenwood – drums (2010–present)
Milton Evans – keyboards, trumpet, backing vocals (2005–present)

Former members
David Ian "Shutty" Shuttleworth – drums (1987–2001, 2005–2010)
Josephine Ellul – keyboards (1998–2001)

Former session member
Danny Lambert – bass, backing vocals (2007)

Touring Members
 Chris Catalyst - keyboards (2016, 2020)

Discography

Studio albums

Compilation albums

Live albums

Singles

References

External links
Official Terrorvision website
Terrorvision at Discogs.com
BBC history of the band
Last FM - tracks and videos
Mark Yates paintings and prints
Official Us Wolves website

English rock music groups
People from Keighley
Kerrang! Awards winners
Musical groups from Bradford